Sadd-e Shavur (also Romanized as Sadd-e Shāvūr; also known as Alsad, Sadd-e Shāhūr, Shāhūr, and Shāvūr) is a village in Seyyed Abbas Rural District, Shavur District, Shush County, Khuzestan Province, Iran. At the 2006 census, its population was 1,114, in 214 families.

References 

Populated places in Shush County